Bočaj is an archaeological site in Kosinj, Croatia.

References

Lika-Senj County